Robert Kabbas (born 15 March 1955, in Alexandria, Egypt) is a retired weightlifter from Australia, who won the silver medal in the Lightheavyweight (82.5 kg) category at the 1984 Summer Olympics.

Kabbas has been one of the most successful weightlifters to represent Australia at the Commonwealth Games. He went to three Olympic Games: Montreal 1976, Moscow 1980 and Los Angeles in 1984. He was the first of only two Australian weightlifters to compete at three Olympics. The LA Olympics were one of the highlights of Kabbas' career as he lifted a personal best of 342.5 kg and set a Commonwealth record.

Winning medals at three Commonwealth Games: Edmonton 1978 (Gold Medal), Brisbane 1982 (Gold Medal) and Edinburgh 1986 (Silver Medal), he was also the best weightlifter across all weight classes at Edmonton. Kabbas remains in the sport, still coaching and developing athletes.

Kabbas became president of the Australian Weightlifting Federation in October 2007.

Notes and references 

Living people
1955 births
Weightlifters at the 1978 Commonwealth Games
Weightlifters at the 1982 Commonwealth Games
Weightlifters at the 1986 Commonwealth Games
Egyptian emigrants to Australia
Olympic silver medalists for Australia
Olympic weightlifters of Australia
Sportspeople from Alexandria
Weightlifters at the 1976 Summer Olympics
Weightlifters at the 1980 Summer Olympics
Weightlifters at the 1984 Summer Olympics
Olympic medalists in weightlifting
Australian male weightlifters
Medalists at the 1984 Summer Olympics
Commonwealth Games medallists in weightlifting
Commonwealth Games gold medallists for Australia
Commonwealth Games silver medallists for Australia
20th-century Australian people
Medallists at the 1978 Commonwealth Games
Medallists at the 1982 Commonwealth Games
Medallists at the 1986 Commonwealth Games